The Providence Fire Department provides fire protection and emergency medical services to the city of Providence, Rhode Island.

History
Providence's first fire department was organized in 1759. The state General Assembly raised money to purchase the town's first large water engine, and required every citizen to acquire a pair of two-gallon leather buckets to form volunteer bucket brigades.

On March 1, 1854, a paid fire department was established, making it the second oldest professional fire department in the country.

A years-long contract dispute between the city and the firefighter's union began in 2001. Mayor David Cicilline promised to resolve the dispute within 30 days of his election in 2002, but was unable to reach an agreement. In 2009, the dispute became national news as Vice President Joe Biden refused to attend the national mayor’s conference, held that year in Providence, so as not to cross the picket line.

As part of a 2017 agreement reached by mayor Jorge Elorza, the Humboldt Avenue and Rochambeau Avenue firehouses were decommissioned to save costs.

Operations

Fire Station Locations and Apparatus
The PFD operates out of twelve fire stations, organized into three battalions

Former stations

References

External links

Organizations based in Providence, Rhode Island
Fire departments in Rhode Island